Kimie Morita (born February 27, 1958) is a Japanese former volleyball player who competed in the 1984 Summer Olympics.

In 1984 she was a member of the Japanese team which won the bronze medal in the Olympic tournament.

References 
 

1958 births
Living people
Olympic volleyball players of Japan
Volleyball players at the 1984 Summer Olympics
Olympic bronze medalists for Japan
Japanese women's volleyball players
Olympic medalists in volleyball
Asian Games medalists in volleyball
Volleyball players at the 1982 Asian Games
Medalists at the 1984 Summer Olympics
Medalists at the 1982 Asian Games
Asian Games silver medalists for Japan